Richard Francis Arthur Goffin (15 February 1886–1973) was an English footballer who played in the Football League for Clapton Orient.

References

1886 births
1968 deaths
English footballers
Association football forwards
English Football League players
Leyton Orient F.C. players
Gillingham F.C. players
Uxbridge F.C. players